Samuel Napier may refer to:
 Samuel Napier (Canadian politician), member of the Legislative Assembly of New Brunswick
 Samuel Napier (Northern Irish politician)
 Sam Napier (footballer), Irish footballer